Pingasa tapungkanana is a moth of the family Geometridae first described by Embrik Strand in 1910. It is found on Sumatra.

References

Moths described in 1910
Pseudoterpnini